Gloeocantharellus purpurascens, commonly known as the Indian Creek mushroom or violet-staining chanterelle, is a species of fungus in the family Gomphaceae native to North America and French Guiana.

Taxonomy 
The species was initially described as Cantharellus purpurascens by Lexemuel Ray Hesler in 1943, from material collected from forest around Indian Creek, North Carolina on 11 August 1940 by Hesler and A. J. Sharp. It was given its current name in 1945 by Rolf Singer.

Description 
The surface is smooth and the cap margins are inrolled in young mushrooms. These ridges fork 1–3 times along their length and are buff, turning dark purple when bruised or cut. It stains wine-coloured when bruised or cut.

The dark purple bruising distinguishes it from edible chanterelles to which it has a superficial resemblance in shape.

Ecology 
In the United States it is found in the Great Smoky Mountains National Park in the Appalachian Mountains in North Carolina, where it grows in maple-hemlock forest. It is mycorrhizal. Mushrooms appear singly or in scattered groups of up to 30 in August and September.

Its edibility is unknown.

References 

Gomphaceae
Fungi of North America
Fungi of South America
Fungi described in 1944
Taxa named by Lexemuel Ray Hesler